Kalpathy or Kalpathi is a residential area in Palakkad city, Kerala, India. It is famous for the Viswanatha Swamy Temple, which is located along the banks of the Kalpathy river, one of the tributaries of the Bharathapuzha. Kalpathy is also famous for its agraharam, or traditional village. It is the first heritage village in Kerala. There are around 4 agraharams of Brahmins who migrated from Tamil Nadu so many years ago to Kalpathy. Many temples, other than the Viswanatha Swamy Temple, are also present here. The annual festival Kalpathi Ratholsavam is held here, with chariots as the main attraction. Kalpathy and it's neighbourhoods have witnessed large settlements of people in colonies and apartments, making it one of the major residential areas of the city.

Temples
Viswanatha Swamy Temple
Lakshmi Narayana Swamy Temple
Sree Prasanna Mahaganapathy Temple
Manthakkara Sree Maha Ganapathy
Sri Varadaraja Perumal Temple
Vaidhyanathapuram Krishna Temple

Location
Kalpathy is located about 3 km from the center of the city. City service buses are there to connect Kalpathy with other parts. The nearest major railway station is Palakkad Junction railway station and the nearest airport is Coimbatore International Airport.

References

Palakkad
Suburbs of Palakkad
Cities and towns in Palakkad district